Frank Wilcox (1907–1974) was an American character actor.

Frank Wilcox may also refer to:

 Frank N. Wilcox (1887–1964), American artist

See also
 Frank Wilcoxon (1892–1965), American chemist